is a Japanese politician serving in the House of Representatives of Japan as a member of the Liberal Democratic Party. He is the Chairman of the Committee on Rules and Administration. He was elected by the first district of the Japanese prefecture of Gunma. In 2005, he was the Chief Deputy Secretary General of the Liberal Democratic Party.

According to Kyodo News International, in 1999 he received JPY8 million in political donations from the construction company of his father by channeling the money through political organizations. Individual politicians in Japan are banned from receiving more than 500,000 a year until 1999, after which all corporate donations were banned, but there was no such ban on donations by political organizations. On 27 December 2006 he resigned as a result of this scandal from his position as state minister in charge of administrative reform, only 3 months after being appointed by Prime Minister Shinzō Abe.

External links 
 Profile at JANJAN
 The website of Genchiro Sata. 
 The House of Representatives of Japan's list of current officers.
 The House of Representatives of Japan's list of members by constituency.
 "LDP's Sata received political funds via legal loophole". Kyodo News International, Inc. October 18, 2000.
 "LEAD: Koizumi seeks cooperation from pro-Pyongyang group on N. Korea". Kyodo News International, Inc. May 31, 2005.

1952 births
Living people
People from Maebashi
Members of the House of Representatives (Japan)
Government ministers of Japan
Liberal Democratic Party (Japan) politicians
Hokkaido University alumni
21st-century Japanese politicians
Members of the House of Representatives from Gunma Prefecture